Cosmotoma suturalis is a species of longhorn beetle of the subfamily Lamiinae. It was described by Gilmour in 1955, and is known from northwestern Brazil, Peru, and Bolivia.

References

Beetles described in 1955
Cosmotoma